Symphonic Dances may refer to:

Symphonic Dances (Rachmaninoff), an orchestral suite
Symphonic Dances (Grieg)
Symphonic Dances by Paul Hindemith
Symphonic Dances by Clifton Williams
Symphonic Dances from West Side Story, by Leonard Bernstein, from his music for West Side Story